Caldimonas hydrothermale is a Gram negative, thermophilic and motile bacterium from the genus Caldimonas with a single polar flagellum which has been isolated from a natural thermal spring in Tozeur in Tunisia.

References

External links 

Type strain of Caldimonas hydrothermale at BacDive -  the Bacterial Diversity Metadatabase

Comamonadaceae
Bacteria described in 2010